The 1st Iranian Majlis was a legislative assembly from October 7, 1906, to June 23, 1908. Its session was formally opened by Mozaffar ad-Din Shah Qajar.

Mozaffar's son and successor, Mohammad Ali Shah Qajar, became Shah on January 21, 1907.  He was against the constitution that was ratified during the reign of his father. In 1907 Mohammad Ali dissolved Majles (Iranian parliament/National assembly) and declared the Constitution abolished because it was contrary to Islamic law.  On June 23, 1908, the Shah bombarded the Majles with the military and political support of Russia and Britain.

Morteza Gholi Khan Hedayat was the first Chairman of the period. According to W. Morgan Shuster, "Five days later [measured from February 1st] the Persian Minister of Finance, Saniu'd-Dawleh was shot and killed in the streets of Tehran by two Georgians, who also succeeded in wounding four of the Persian police before they were captured. The Russian consular authorities promptly refused to allow these men to be tried by the Persian Government, and took them out of the country under Russian protection, claiming that they would be suitably punished."

Prime ministers
 Mirza Nasrullah Khan  1 August 1906 -  17 March 1907,  Constitutional Movement
 Amir Mirza Ali Asghar Khan  (1 May 1907 -  31 August 1907)(assassinated),  Independent
Mohammad-Vali Khan Tonekaboni (1st Term)  13 September 1907 - 21 December 1907,  Constitutional Movement
 Hossein Mafi,  21 December 1907 -  21 May 1908,  Justice Party
 Morteza-Gholi Khan Hedayat,  21 May 1908 - 7 June 1908, Constitutional Movement

See also
Persian Constitution of 1906
Persian Constitutional Revolution

References

1st term of the Iranian Majlis
Politics of Qajar Iran